Lynda Grose is a designer in fashion and sustainability, educator, and consultant known for her pioneering work in sustainable fashion design.

Career
In 1990 Grose co-founded Esprit’s e-collection division, a five-year research and development project marketed in 13 countries, which is cited "as the first ecologically responsible clothing line developed by a major corporation" and in doing so, Grose "set pioneering standards for the textile industry".  Her Ecollection was founded in response to Esprit's company-wide focus on environmental awareness, begun by Esprit co-founder Doug Tompkins.  Grose's project began by researching the environmental impact of making Esprit clothing - from growing fibers, to dyeing, manufacturing and garment finishing.  The Ecollection used organic cotton, and less toxic dyes as a first step.  Grose also began contracting with crafts cooperatives to hand-knit sweaters and make buttons and jewelry from tagua nuts.  Grose believed that community development and fair treatment of textile workers was as important a part of the project as using more sustainable materials.

Grose is Professor and Chair of the Fashion Design program at California College of the Arts. She is a founding member of The Center for Sustainable Design, Surrey, England, and the International Society for Sustainable Design, and the Sustainable Cotton Project.

Work
Lynda Grose co-authored with Dr. Kate Fletcher the book Fashion and Sustainability Design for Change.  She has published in journals and magazines and has contributed to 'Opening up the Wardrobe: a methods book' (Novus), 'Fashion Fibers: Designing for Sustainability', (Bloomsbury), 'The Routledge Handbook on Sustainable Fashion (Routledge), Sustainable Textiles: Life Cycle and Environmental Impact (Woodhouse Publishing, London), and Sustainability in Fashion and Textiles: Values, Design, Production and Consumption (Greenleaf Publishing).

Awards and nominations
In 2007, she was listed on Grist's'' list of “15 Green Fashionistas".

References

External links
 Lynda Grose's faculty page at CCA
 Sustainable Cotton Project
 The Center for Sustainable Design
 the International Society for Sustainable Design

Living people
California College of the Arts faculty
American fashion designers
Date of birth missing (living people)
Sustainability advocates
Year of birth missing (living people)